Bagge & Peer is a songwriter-producer partnership made up of two Swedish music producers Anders Bagge and Peer Åström. They are also major contributors for the Stockholm-based Murlyn Music Group as Bagge is co-founder and co-owner of the music enterprise.

Bagge & Peer have together written and produced songs for Lara Fabian, Celine Dion, Cyndi Lauper, Madonna, Ace of Base, Ashley Tisdale, Enrique Iglesias, Jennifer Lopez and several others.

See also
Anders Bagge
Peer Åström

Record production duos
Songwriting teams
Swedish musical duos